Corneille is a given name and surname. Notable people with the name include:


Given name
 Corneille of Berghes (1490?–1560?), Prince-bishop of Liège
 Corneille of Burgundy (1420–1452), an illegitimate son of Philip the Good, Duke of Burgundy
 Corneille de Lyon (died 1575), Dutch portrait painter
 Corneille Guillaume Beverloo (1922–2010), Dutch painter
 Corneille Cacheux (1687–1738), French pipe-organ maker
 Corneille Ewango, Congolese environmentalist
 Corneille Heymans (1892–1968), Belgian physiologist

Surname
 Marcelle Corneille (1923–2019), Canadian administrator and educator
 Mark Corneille (born 1986), English footballer
 Michel Corneille the Elder (c. 1601–1664), French painter, etcher, and engraver
 Michel Corneille the Younger (1642–1708), French painter, etcher and engraver, son of the above
 Pierre Corneille (1606–1684), French dramatist
 Thomas Corneille (1625–1709), French dramatist

Stage name
 Corneille (singer), stage name of Rwandan–Canadian rhythm and blues singer Cornelius Nyungura (born 1977)

See also
 Lycée Corneille (disambiguation), schools

Masculine given names